BloodNet is a cyberpunk-themed role-playing video game video game developed and published by MicroProse for MS-DOS in 1993. An Amiga port was released in 1994 by Catfish and Teeny Weeny Games. An emulated version for Microsoft Windows, Mac OS X and Linux was released in 2014.

Gameplay
The interface in BloodNet is standard point and click with some icon-based commands available from a drop down menu. The game features written dialog and puzzles, in addition to an open-ended travel system and random encounters. An alternate "cyberspace universe" is also part of the gameplay, where codewords are needed to travel to different "wells" (cyberspace locations). Role-playing elements are also present in Bloodnet: the player character and other recruitable characters for the player's party have number-based stats (such as Perception, Hacking, etc.), and combat is based on the player character's attributes and stats.

Plot
A mix of future tech and gothic vampire story, in the cyberpunk style, BloodNet puts the player into the role of a man named Ransom Stark, who must battle a vampire named Abraham Van Helsing who is attempting world domination and save both humanity and the cybernet. Ransom Stark was bitten by the aforementioned vampire, but is able to fight off the infection with the help of a computer grafted onto his brain stem. He must then embark on a journey to defeat the head vampire, Dracula, to stop the infection.

Reception

Computer Gaming World in February 1994 approved of BloodNet combining vampires and cyberpunk, non-linear gameplay, "interesting" characters and storyline, and streamlined interface. The reviewer said, however, that "the game as a whole left me vaguely dissatisfied", citing a lack of direction in the story and pacing, lack of detail in Cyberspace, "confusing and frustrating" combat, and an unavoidable repeating random encounter. He concluded that BloodNet was "a gem without polish". Dragon gave the game 3 out of 5 stars. Pelit rated BloodNet 82% in the February 1994 issue, with the summary of "beautiful graphics, great atmosphere, but almost everything could have done better".

BloodNet was a runner-up for Computer Gaming Worlds Role-Playing Game of the Year award in June 1994, losing to Betrayal at Krondor. The editors wrote that BloodNets "script [...] is one of the most interesting to hit this genre, and the surrealistic aspects to the art style are definitely fascinating". Richard Cobbett of PC Gamer, retrospectively reviewing the game in 2013, gave it a negative review stating that it was confusing, dull, and tedious.

The One gave the Amiga version of BloodNet an overall score of 84%, stating that "The AI system is great ... with party characters volunteering for jobs, offering opinions and reacting to your actions. It's the best implementation of this idea I've seen." The One praised the rendered 3D-esque graphics, and also expressed their reliance on the manual for reference to items in the game, as they describe BloodNet as being "littered with objects that seem to serve no purpose ... lots of flipping back and forth between pages is necessary." The One also criticized the amount of disk swapping needed to play the game, frustrated that common actions such as examining objects and dialogue requires this, furthermore saying "it's just not playable from floppy. Shame on you, Gametek, for suggesting, even if only by omission, that it is."

Legacy
A company called "Megalo Music" claims to have written the music for a game titled Bloodnet 2000, which may or may not be a proposed sequel to Bloodnet. The game designer for Bloodnet, John Antinori, has since stated that the sequel was "never meaningfully worked on", and that he never would have agreed to the title "Bloodnet 2000" because "Bloodnet was set well in future past 2000".

Tommo purchased the rights to this game and digitally published it through its Retroism brand in 2015. Bloodnet was re-released digitally on GOG.com on January 9, 2014 and on Steam on October 17, 2014.

References

External links

BloodNet at Amiga Hall of Light
Walkthrough at GameFAQs
Complete Game Guide The Complete Unofficial Players Guide by Chris The Gronk

1993 video games
Amiga games
Amiga 1200 games
Cyberpunk video games
DOS games
Games commercially released with DOSBox
1990s horror video games
MicroProse games
Point-and-click adventure games
Role-playing video games
Single-player video games
Video games about vampires
Video games developed in the United States
Video games about virtual reality
GameTek games
Tommo games